In mathematics the differential calculus over commutative algebras is a part of commutative algebra based on the observation that most concepts known from classical differential calculus can be formulated in purely algebraic terms. Instances of this are:
 The whole topological information of a smooth manifold  is encoded in the algebraic properties of its -algebra of smooth functions  as in the Banach–Stone theorem.
 Vector bundles over  correspond to projective finitely generated modules over  via the functor  which associates to a vector bundle its module of sections.
 More generally, a linear differential operator of order k, sending sections of a vector bundle  to sections of another bundle  is seen to be an -linear map  between the associated modules, such that for any  elements :

where the bracket  is defined as the commutator

Denoting the set of th order linear differential operators from an -module  to an -module  with  we obtain a bi-functor with values in the category of -modules. Other natural concepts of calculus such as jet spaces, differential forms are then obtained as representing objects of the functors  and related functors.

Seen from this point of view calculus may in fact be understood as the theory of these functors and their representing objects.

Replacing the real numbers  with any commutative ring, and the algebra  with any commutative algebra the above said remains meaningful, hence differential calculus can be developed for arbitrary commutative algebras. Many of these concepts are widely used in algebraic geometry, differential geometry and secondary calculus. Moreover, the theory generalizes naturally to the setting of graded commutative algebra, allowing for a natural foundation of calculus on supermanifolds, graded manifolds and associated concepts like the Berezin integral.

See also

References 

 J. Nestruev, Smooth Manifolds and Observables, Graduate Texts in Mathematics 220, Springer, 2002.
  
 I. S. Krasil'shchik, "Lectures on Linear Differential Operators over Commutative Algebras". Eprint DIPS-01/99.
 I. S. Krasil'shchik, A. M. Vinogradov (eds) "Algebraic Aspects of Differential Calculus", Acta Appl. Math. 49 (1997), Eprints: DIPS-01/96, DIPS-02/96, DIPS-03/96, DIPS-04/96, DIPS-05/96, DIPS-06/96, DIPS-07/96, DIPS-08/96. 
 I. S. Krasil'shchik, A. M. Verbovetsky, "Homological Methods in Equations of Mathematical Physics", Open Ed. and Sciences, Opava (Czech Rep.), 1998; Eprint arXiv:math/9808130v2.
 G. Sardanashvily, Lectures on Differential Geometry of Modules and Rings, Lambert Academic Publishing, 2012; Eprint arXiv:0910.1515 [math-ph] 137 pages. 
 A. M. Vinogradov, "The Logic Algebra for the Theory of Linear Differential Operators", Dokl. Akad. Nauk SSSR, 295(5) (1972) 1025-1028; English transl. in Soviet Math. Dokl. 13(4) (1972), 1058-1062.
 A. M. Vinogradov, "Cohomological Analysis of Partial Differential Equations and Secondary Calculus", AMS, series: Translations of Mathematical Monograph, 204, 2001.
 A. M. Vinogradov, "Some new homological systems associated with differential calculus over commutative algebras" (Russian), Uspechi Mat.Nauk, 1979, 34 (6), 145-150;English transl. in Russian Math. Surveys, 34(6) (1979), 250-255.

Commutative algebra
Differential calculus